The Swedish men's handball champions (Swedish: Svenska mästare i handboll för herrar) have been determined by three different competitions. From 1931–32 until 1951–52, the title was decided by a straight knockout tournament known as Svenska mästerskapet ("the Swedish Championship"). After 1934–35, it was played parallel to the highest league, Allsvenskan. The tournament was contested by the winners of the Distriktsmästerskap ("Provincial Championships") until 1945–46. After that it was contested by all teams from the top division, all Provincial Champions and invited teams from lower leagues. From 1952–53 until 1966–67, the title of Swedish Champions was awarded to the winners of Allsvenskan. Since 1967–68, the Swedish Champions have been determined by a playoffs competition between the highest-placed teams in the top league. Until 2003–04, all playoff rounds were decided by a series of home and away matches. Between 2004–05 and 2017–18 the final was played as a single match at a pre-determined venue. Since 2018–19, the final is again played as a series. The league changed its name to Elitserien in 1990–91 and to Handbollsligan in 2016–17.

Redbergslid have won the most Swedish Championships with 20, followed by Drott at 11. These two clubs completely dominated Swedish men's handball from 1983–84 to 2002–03, winning all titles but one. They are followed by Kristianstad at 8 titles and a trio of clubs at 7 titles: Heim, Hellas and Majorna. Majorna have won the title the most times in a row, winning it five times from 1942 to 1946. Västerås IK and AIK are the only teams to have won the championship (in its pre-1952 knockout format) while playing outside the top flight. Drott have been runners-up 12 times, more than any other team. Guif, IFK Karlskrona and Stockholms-Flottan are the only teams to have been runners-up four times without winning the title. Teams from the Gothenburg area (Redbergslid, Heim, Majorna and Sävehof) have won 40 of 88 titles. Since 1978, clubs from southern and western Götaland have won 39 of 42 titles, the other three being won by Stockholm club Hammarby. The current champions are Sävehof.

List

Svenska mästerskapet (1931–1952)
Teams in bold are those who also won Allsvenskan. Teams in italics are those from outside Allsvenskan (since its formation in 1934). An asterisk (*) denotes result after extra time.

League winners (1952–1967)

Playoff winners, final series (1967–2004)
Teams in bold are those who also won the regular season. Until 1982–83, series results are given as wins–draws–losses.

Playoff winners, single final (2004–2018)
Teams in bold are those who also won the regular season. An asterisk (*) denotes result after extra time.

Playoff winners, final series (2018–)
Teams in bold are those who also won the regular season.

Total titles won

A total of 20 clubs have been crowned Swedish champions from Flottans IF Karlskrona in 1932 until Ystads IF in 2022.
A total of 90 Swedish championships have been awarded. Redbergslids IK is the most successful club with 20 Swedish Championship titles.

Teams are ranked by number of titles, then by number of times they have been runners-up, then alphabetically. Teams in bold are those who play in Handbollsligan in 2021–22.

See also
Handbollsligan

Notes

References 

Champions
Handball-related lists